Agonum trigeminum is a species of beetle in the family Carabidae that is endemic to the United States.

References

Beetles described in 1954
trigeminum
Endemic fauna of the United States
Beetles of North America